This is a list of pay-per-view events promoted by Ring of Honor (ROH).

Past events

2007

2008

2009

2010

2011

2012

2013

2014

2015

2016

2017

2018

2019

2020

2021

2022

Upcoming event schedule

2023

Number of events by year
2007 – 5
2008 – 5
2009 – 3
2010 – 4
2011 – 5
2012 – 8
2013 – 5
2014 – 5
2015 – 5
2016 – 6
2017 – 8
2018 – 5
2019 – 6
2020 – 1
2021 – 4
2022 – 3
2023 – 1
Total – 79

See also
List of All Elite Wrestling pay-per-view events
List of ECW supercards and pay-per-view events
List of FMW supercards and pay-per-view events
List of Global Force Wrestling events and specials
List of Impact Wrestling pay-per-view events
List of Major League Wrestling events
List of National Wrestling Alliance pay-per-view events
List of NWA/WCW closed-circuit events and pay-per-view events
List of NJPW pay-per-view events
List of Smokey Mountain Wrestling supercard events
List of World Class Championship Wrestling Supercard events
List of WWA pay-per-view events
List of WWE pay-per-view and WWE Network events

References

External links
 ROHWrestling.com

 
Ring of Honor pay-per-view events
Ring of Honor